Elaheh Mansourian (born 21 September 1991, Semirom, Isfahan) is Iranian wushu athlete who competes in the sanda 52 and 65 kg divisions. She held the world title in 2013 and 2017 and 2019 and won three medals at the Asian Games in 2014–2018.

Her sisters Shahrbanoo and Soheila Mansourian are also world champions in wushu.

References

External links

See also 

 Shahrbanoo Mansourian
 Soheila Mansourian

Iranian sanshou practitioners
Asian Games silver medalists for Iran
Asian Games bronze medalists for Iran
Asian Games medalists in wushu
Wushu practitioners at the 2010 Asian Games
Wushu practitioners at the 2014 Asian Games
Wushu practitioners at the 2018 Asian Games
Medalists at the 2010 Asian Games
Medalists at the 2014 Asian Games
Medalists at the 2018 Asian Games
1991 births
Living people
People from Semirom